Robert Lee Howze (August 22, 1864 – September 19, 1926) was a United States Army major general who was a recipient of the Medal of Honor for his actions during the American Indian Wars.

Howze graduated from the United States Military Academy in 1888 and then accepted a commission to the United States Army. He first served in the Indian Wars, then served in the Spanish–American War, Philippine–American War and World War I. His last assignment was presiding over the courts-martial of Colonel Billy Mitchell.

Early life

Howze was born to Captain James A. Howze, of the 14th Texas Cavalry, and Amanda Hamilton Howze in Overton, Rusk County, Texas. After graduating from Hubbard College in 1883, he attended the United States Military Academy (USMA) at West Point, New York and was in the graduating class of 1888. His classmates included several future general officers, such as Peyton C. March, William M. Morrow, James W. McAndrew, William Robert Dashiell, Peter Charles Harris, Eli Alva Helmick, Henry Jervey Jr., William Voorhees Judson, John Louis Hayden, Edward Anderson, William H. Hart, Charles Aloysius Hedekin and William S. Peirce.

Military career
Howze participated in the Pine Ridge Campaign from November 1890 to January 1891. On January 1, 1891, the 6th Cavalry crossed the frozen White River in South Dakota to engage a group of Brulé Sioux. It was for this action he was presented with the Medal of Honor.

Howze married Anne Chiffelle Hawkins, daughter of General Hamilton S. Hawkins, on February 24, 1897.

At the outbreak of the Spanish–American War, Howze, now a cavalry captain, was made adjutant general of the cavalry in Cuba. Upon his return to the United States, he was appointed lieutenant colonel of volunteers and commanded the Thirty-fourth Volunteer Infantry throughout the Philippine Insurrection. He was promoted to captain in the United States Army on February 2, 1901; to brigadier general of volunteers on June 20, 1901; and to major of the Puerto Rico provincial regiment of infantry in 1901.  He received two Silver Citation Stars (converted in 1932 to the Silver Star decoration) for actions respectively in Cuba and the Philippines.

In 1905, Howze was appointed commandant of cadets at West Point, remaining in that post until 1909. In 1907 he threatened to discharge an entire class from the academy over a hazing incident. Howze was a major in the 11th Cavalry during General John J. Pershing's Punitive Expedition into Mexico in 1916.

During World War I Howze was promoted to major general and placed in command of the 38th Infantry Division, which fought in the Meuse-Argonne Offensive in October 1918. He served as commander of the 3rd Division during their march on the Rhine River, and commanded the Third Army of Occupation in Germany in 1919. He was awarded the Army Distinguished Service Medal, the French Croix de Guerre, and French Legion of Honor for his service in command of the Third Army.

General Howze died while on active duty on September 19, 1926, at age 62, and is buried in the United States Military Academy Cemetery at West Point, New York.

Court-martial of Billy Mitchell
Howze's last assignment was to preside over the court-martial of Colonel Billy Mitchell, who had made public comments in response to the Navy dirigible  crashing in a storm. The crash killed 14 of the crew and Mitchell issued a statement accusing senior leaders in the Army and Navy of incompetence and "almost treasonable administration of the national defense." In November 1925 he was court-martialed at the direct order of President Calvin Coolidge. The trial attracted significant interest, and public opinion supported Mitchell. The court found Mitchell guilty of insubordination, and suspended him from active duty for five years without pay. The generals ruling in the case wrote, "The Court is thus lenient because of the military record of the Accused during the World War." On February 1, 1926, Mitchell resigned in-lieu of accepting the courts punishment.

Military awards
Medal of Honor
Distinguished Service Medal
Silver Star with oak leaf cluster
Indian Campaign Medal
Spanish Campaign Medal
Army of Cuban Occupation Medal
Philippine Campaign Medal
Mexican Border Service Medal
Victory Medal
Officer, French Legion of Honor 
French Croix de Guerre

Medal of Honor citation
Rank and organization: Second Lieutenant, Company K, 6th U.S. Cavalry. Place and date: At White River, S. Dak., 1 January 1891. Entered service at: Overton, Rusk County, Tex. Born: 22 August 1864, Overton, Rusk County, Tex. Date of issue: 25 July 1891.

Citation:
Bravery in action.

Army Distinguished Service Medal citation
Citation:
The President of the United States of America, authorized by Act of Congress, July 9, 1918, takes pleasure in presenting the Army Distinguished Service Medal to Major General Robert Lee Howze, United States Army, for exceptionally meritorious and distinguished services to the Government of the United States, in a duty of great responsibility during World War I. As Commander of the 3d Division on its march to the Rhine and during the occupation of the enemy territory General Howze proved himself energetic and capable, exhibiting superb qualities of leadership. He maintained an unusually high standard of efficiency in his unit, rendering eminently conspicuous service as a Division Commander.

Dates of rank

Source: Army Register, 1926

Namesakes

Camp Howze
There were two military installations named in honor of General Howze.

Camp Howze, Texas, was a large World War II training facility near Gainesville, Texas.

Camp Howze, South Korea, was a US Army installation located off Main Supply Route (MSR) 1 near the towns of Kumchon and Paju-Ri.

USS General R. L. Howze (AP-134)
The , launched May 1943, was named in his honor.

Relations
Two of his sons graduated from the U.S. Military Academy at West Point and became generals: Major General Robert Lee Howze Jr., Class of 1925, and General Hamilton H. Howze, Class of 1930.

See also

List of Medal of Honor recipients for the Indian Wars
List of United States Military Academy alumni (Medal of Honor)

References

Citations

Bibliography
 Maksel, Rebecca. "The Billy Mitchell Court-Martial". Air & Space, Vol. 24, No. 2, 46–49.

Further reading

External links

 Robert Lee Howze Jr. biography

1864 births
1926 deaths
United States Army Medal of Honor recipients
United States Army generals of World War I
United States Military Academy alumni
Commandants of the Corps of Cadets of the United States Military Academy
Burials at West Point Cemetery
People of the Mexican Revolution
American military personnel of the Spanish–American War
American military personnel of the Philippine–American War
American military personnel of the Indian Wars
Recipients of the Distinguished Service Medal (US Army)
Recipients of the Silver Star
Recipients of the Croix de Guerre 1914–1918 (France)
Recipients of the Legion of Honour
People from Overton, Texas
People from Highlands, New York
American Indian Wars recipients of the Medal of Honor
Pine Ridge Campaign
United States Army generals
United States Military Academy faculty
Military personnel from Texas